Josie Gabuco (born March 30, 1987) is a Filipina boxer best known for winning her country's first ever gold medal in the AIBA Women's World Boxing Championships. She is also the most successful boxer in the history of the Southeast Asian Games with a record five gold medals.

Early life and education
A native of Puerto Princesa, Palawan, Gabuco was born on March 30, 1987. She took up the sport of boxing in 2003 with the intention of using it as a means to enter a college under a scholarship program. She was able to attend the STI College in Manila where she pursued a course on Criminology.

Career
Gabuco earned a slot in the Philippine national team after winning gold at the 2004 National Open. Gabuco first made international headlines in 2008 when she won a bronze medal in the pinweight division at the AIBA Women's World Boxing Championships held in Ningbo. 

In 2009, she captured a bronze medal in the Asian Indoor Games in Hanoi and claimed her first SEA Games gold medal in Vientiane later that year. She successfully defended her pinweight title in the 2011 Southeast Asian Games in Palembang. 

She won the first gold medal for the Philippines in the AIBA Women's World Boxing Championships in 2012 after ruling the light flyweight category.

2012 World Championships Results
 Defeated  Yairineth Altuve (Venezuela)  PTS (24–13)
 Defeated  Derya Aktop (Turkey)  PTS (27–10)
 Defeated  Kim Klavel (Canada)  PTS (21–15)
 Defeated  Svetlana Gnevanova (Russia)  PTS (12–7)
 Defeated  Xu Shiqi (China)  PTS (10–9)

For her feat, Gabuco was named one of the four recipients of the 2012 Athlete of the Year Award by the Philippine Sportswriters Association along with fellow boxer, Nonito Donaire Jr. and the Ateneo Blue Eagles and women's national softball team.

In 2013, Gabuco became the first Filipina boxer to win three gold medals in the SEA Games after ruling the light flyweight class in Napyidaw. Gabuco competed as a flyweight in the 2014 Asian Games in Incheon but lost to Vietnam’s Le Thi Bang in the quarterfinals.

She trimmed down to light flyweight at the 2015 Southeast Asian Games in Singapore where she captured a record fourth gold medal. Thus, Gabuco became just the second Filipino boxer to win four gold medals in the SEA Games after Arlo Chavez in the 1990s. She was denied a chance for a fifth consecutive SEAG gold medal after women’s boxing was scrapped from the 2017 Southeast Asian Games calendar. 

At the 2019 Asian Amateur Boxing Championships in Bangkok, Thailand, Gabuco clinched a gold medal in the light flyweight division after winning over Kim Hyang-mi of North Korea in the final bout.

Gabuco won a record fifth gold medal at the 2019 Southeast Asian Games after defeating Indonesian Endang in the light flyweight final despite nursing a flu.  She became just the second boxer in SEAG history to win five gold medals after Thailand’s Somjit Jongjohor.

Personal life
Gabuco is a single mother and has a son. She is also enlisted in the Philippine Navy.

References

1987 births
Living people
Filipino women boxers
Boxers at the 2014 Asian Games
AIBA Women's World Boxing Championships medalists
People from Puerto Princesa
Southeast Asian Games medalists in boxing
Southeast Asian Games gold medalists for the Philippines
Southeast Asian Games competitors for the Philippines
Competitors at the 2009 Southeast Asian Games
Competitors at the 2011 Southeast Asian Games
Competitors at the 2013 Southeast Asian Games
Competitors at the 2015 Southeast Asian Games
Asian Games competitors for the Philippines
Competitors at the 2019 Southeast Asian Games
Light-flyweight boxers
Southeast Asian Games bronze medalists for the Philippines
Competitors at the 2021 Southeast Asian Games
21st-century Filipino women